Mezair may refer to:

 Hichem Mezaïr,  an Algerian footballer
 One of the Airs above the ground or school jumps performed by horses in classical dressage.